Pikmin 3 is a real-time strategy and puzzle video game developed and published by Nintendo for the Wii U video game console. It is the sequel to the GameCube games Pikmin (2001) and Pikmin 2 (2004), and was released in Japan on July 13, 2013, and in all other regions within the following month. Shigeru Miyamoto announced Pikmin 3 on July 16, 2008, for the Wii console, later stating at E3 2011 that it had transitioned to Wii U.

The game builds upon existing elements of the Pikmin series, adding more player characters, Pikmin types, and support for Off-TV Play and downloadable content. In the single-player campaign, the player controls three alien captains, who explore the surface of a planet they name PNF-404 in search of cultivable fruit seeds to save their home planet, Koppai, from famine. They befriend the Pikmin who assist them in combat, solving puzzles, and amassing resources.

Pikmin 3 received generally positive reviews from critics, with praise for the gameplay, graphics and level design. Pikmin 3 Deluxe, an enhanced port for the Nintendo Switch, was released on October 30, 2020. A stand-alone sequel, Hey! Pikmin, was released in 2017 for Nintendo 3DS, while a direct sequel, Pikmin 4, is set for release in July 2023.

Gameplay
The player controls a captain which commands a horde of up to 100 plant-like creatures called Pikmin, and uses their unique abilities to explore the world, combat enemies, solve puzzles, and amass treasures. Pikmin can be directed to accomplish various tasks, such as building bridges, destroying barriers, collecting spoils and defeating enemies. They come in various colors and different physical features that signify their special abilities or immunities to hazards. For example, Red Pikmin are immune to fire and can fight harder, Yellow Pikmin are immune to electricity and can be thrown farther, and Blue Pikmin are immune to water.

The red, yellow, and blue Pikmin continue through the series, and Pikmin 3 introduces two Pikmin types: grey-colored Rock Pikmin, which can destroy tough barriers, and are immune to being crushed by heavy objects; and pink-colored Winged Pikmin, which can attack airborne enemies, carry items through the air, and travel over water.

The player controls up to three new different captains over the Pikmin, one more than in Pikmin 2. The player can instantly switch between these groups in order to accomplish tasks more quickly or solve certain puzzles.

The initial release of Pikmin 3 offers three control schemes: the Wii U GamePad, Wii U Pro Controller, or Wii Remote (Plus) with the Nunchuk accessory. In all cases, the Wii U GamePad has an overhead map on its touch screen. A downloadable update on May 30, 2014, adds stylus control on the GamePad. The GamePad is used to access the similar-looking KopPad, which the captain uses to view the map and other statistics, and for communication with the other squad members. The KopPad allows players to map the captains' routes, and to take photographs with detailed camera controls, which could be uploaded to the now-defunct Miiverse.

Aside from a single-player story campaign, the game features a split-screen, competitive, two-player multiplayer mode called Bingo Battle. In this mode each player has a 4 by 4 grid of items to collect, and must compete to get four-in-a-row on their board. Mission Mode is a single-player or cooperative multiplayer experience where the players are presented with a task based on Pikmin fundamentals, which must be completed in a limited amount of time. There are three trials present within Mission Mode: Collect Treasure, where the players must collect all the fruit and enemies on the map using a set amount of Pikmin before time runs out; Battle Enemies, where the players must kill all the enemies on the map as quickly as possible; and Defeat Bosses, which allows the players to re-encounter the boss creatures from story mode.

Plot
The inhabitants of the planet Koppai are suffering from famine as a result of a "booming population, booming appetites, and a basic lack of planning". Having scouted multiple planets with their SPEROS ships, one returns positive after scouting the Pikmin planet, which they call PNF-404, that has an abundance of cultivable food. Three Koppaite explorer captains, Alph, Brittany, and Charlie, are sent to explore and retrieve food sources. Their ship, the S.S. Drake, malfunctions and crash-lands, separating the three. Captain Charlie falls to the Distant Tundra and meets the Yellow Pikmin, but is eaten by a monster. Alph wakes up in the Tropical Wilds and meets the Red Pikmin, who help him recover their ship. Alph learns that the "cosmic drive key" is required to warp back to Koppai. Alph finds Brittany in the Garden of Hope, and rescues her with the help of Rock Pikmin. The two captains rescue Captain Charlie, after the S.S. Drake crashes and Brittany discovers Yellow Pikmin. They retrieve some fruits for the food supply and harvest the seeds on their journey. The S.S. Drake and the Pikmin Onions ascend into low orbit each evening to avoid voracious nocturnal creatures. The trio recover one of Captain Olimar's lost data files, and suspect that he has the key and explore in his pursuit. Later, they mistakenly rescue Louie, who steals all of their food supply and escapes to the Garden of Hope. After retrieving them both, they restrain and interrogate Louie, who tells them that Olimar is at Formidable Oak. There, the captains and the Pikmin defeat a mysterious life form known as the Plasm Wraith, to save Olimar, who had taken the cosmic-drive key, thinking it is a treasure, and he gives it back. The explorers use the key for the ship, offering Olimar and Louie a ride back to Hocotate, and they return home as the Pikmin wave goodbye.

The narrator speaks at the game's ending, which varies based on the number of fruit the player retrieved during the game. If the player collects a minimum amount of fruit, the narrator states the explorers feel "unease" over the possibility the seeds collected will not be enough to save Koppai. If the player collects a respectable amount of fruit, it is stated that careful planning will be required to save Koppai. If the player collects all fruits, the narrator states that the three have successfully completed their mission to restore life in Koppai and that the cause of the S.S. Drakes crash-landing may be on purpose. In a post-credits scene, some Pikmin see a flaming object falling to the ground and run to it. An additional story in Pikmin 3 Deluxe, "Olimar's Comeback", reveals the object to be a pod containing Olimar and Louie, who are sent back to the planet by the president of Hocotate Freight to repair and retrieve the damaged spaceship they left behind.

Development

Shigeru Miyamoto first hinted about the possibility of a new Pikmin game in a July 2007 interview with IGN, saying "I certainly don't think we've seen the last of Pikmin. I definitely would like to do something with them, and I think the Wii interface in particular is very well suited to that franchise." A later CNET.com interview in April 2008 reported that "For now, Miyamoto looks ahead to other projects for the Wii, mentioning his desire to continue the Pikmin series."

A new Pikmin game was confirmed at E3 2008 during Nintendo's developer roundtable, in which Miyamoto stated that his team were working on a new entry in the series. Details concerning gameplay and development were left unmentioned. At Miyamoto's roundtable discussion at E3 2011, Miyamoto stated that Pikmin 3 development was moved to Wii U, the Wii's successor. He said that the Wii U's HD graphics and secondary-screen GamePad would work better for it.

On June 5, 2012, Pikmin 3 was shown at Nintendo's press conference at E3. Some of the new gameplay aspects were demonstrated, including rock Pikmin and the GamePad controls. The company said that it would be released around the same time as the Wii U, but its release was later delayed until mid-2013. When questioned about the presence or absence of the purple and white Pikmin types featured in the second game, Miyamoto stated that "They're in there somewhere, just hidden...". A video released from Nintendo Direct confirmed that they would in fact be in the game, but only in the game's Mission Mode and Bingo Battle.

In a Polygon interview, Miyamoto stated that he plans to have a series of animated Pikmin shorts released on the Nintendo 3DS prior to Pikmin 3s launch. The shorts went unheard of for months after the game's initial release, were eventually mentioned by Miyamoto a year later, and were announced to be released on November 5, 2014, on the Nintendo eShop.

Release
Pikmin 3 was released in Japan on July 13, 2013. The game was released in Europe on July 26, Australia on July 27, and North America on August 4.

The Collect Treasure stage pack downloadable content (DLC) added four missions on October 1, 2013. Battle Enemies stage pack DLC added four missions on November 6, 2013. Released with the DLC was an update adding GamePad stylus control. A third DLC pack of new stages (rather than remixes of old stages as in previous DLC) was released on December 2, 2013.  Four new Collect Treasure and four new Battle Enemies stages have been announced. An update added one free Collect Treasure and one free Battle Enemies mission.

Pikmin 3 Deluxe
Pikmin 3 Deluxe is an enhanced version for Nintendo Switch, released on October 30, 2020. Eighting handled the porting, planning, development, and coordination of new elements. The game features a new prologue and epilogue featuring Captain Olimar and Louie, multiple difficulty modes, cooperative play in the story mode, the reintroduction of the Piklopedia from Pikmin 2, and all DLC from the Wii U version included.

Reception

The game received generally favorable reviews. Most reviewers praised its well designed levels, high-quality graphics, and gameplay. The four reviewers of Famitsu rated it 37/40 from three 9s and one perfect 10. The Sunday Times gave it 5 out of 5 stars. IGN scored the game 8.8/10, praising its design but stating that it was too short. ITF Gaming gave it a 9/10 for its lush, well-crafted environments. Ben Croshaw of The Escapist praised the graphics, controls, and incentive for urgency, but critiqued the Wii U for not initially utilizing the touch screen as a means of individually selecting targets. This feature was added in a later software update.

Sales 
In Japan, Pikmin 3 became the best selling game of its launch week, with around 93,000 copies in two days and helping to sell 22,200 Wii U systems. In the UK, the game debuted at number 2 in the all-formats chart, behind the retail version of Minecraft for Xbox 360. In the US, it became the best selling game of its debut week, and according to the NPD Group, 115,000 units were sold in its first month, entering the all-formats chart at number 10. , about 210,000 units had been sold in the US.

Pikmin 3 Deluxe became the bestselling retail game during its first week of release in Japan, with 171,349 physical copies sold. , 513,000 physical copies were sold in Japan, as the best selling Pikmin game in Japan. , 2.04 million units of Pikmin 3 Deluxe had been sold. As of December 2021, Pikmin 3 Deluxe have sold 2.23 million copies worldwide.

Notes

References

External links 
 

2013 video games
Cancelled Wii games
Multiplayer and single-player video games
Nintendo Network games
Pikmin
Real-time strategy video games
Video games developed in Japan
Video games with downloadable content
Wii U games
Wii U eShop games
Nintendo Switch games
Asymmetrical multiplayer video games
Split-screen multiplayer games
Video games set on fictional planets
Eighting games